John O'B. Scobey (July 5, 1854 – April 20, 1910) was an American politician in the state of Washington. He served in the Washington House of Representatives.

References

Republican Party members of the Washington House of Representatives
1854 births
1910 deaths
People from Schoharie County, New York
19th-century American politicians
People from Tumwater, Washington